Tu Amor o Tu Desprecio (Eng.: Your Love or Your Disdain) is the fifth studio album by Marco Antonio Solís. It was released on May 13, 2003. This album became his third number-one hit as a solo artist on the Billboard Top Latin Albums chart, won a Latin Grammy Award for Best Regional Mexican Song and won Album of the Year at Premio Lo Nuestro 2004. “Más Que Tu Amigo” served as the opening theme for the telenovela Velo de Novia starring Susana González and Eduardo Santamarina.

Track listing

All songs written and composed by Marco Antonio Solís except where noted

Credits
This information from Allmusic.
Homero Patrón — Piano, arranger, producer, direction, synthesizer
Marco Antonio Solís — Direction, assistant arranger, realization
David Appelt — Mixing
Carlos Castro — Assistant engineer, mixing
Marco Gamboa — Editing, digital sequencing, copyist
Ron McMaster — Mastering
Victor Aguilar — Drums
Jose Guadalupe Alfaro — Vihuela
Luis Conte — Latin percussion
Pedro Iniguez — Accordion
Abraham Laboriel — Electric bass
Jorge Moraga — Strings, string coordinator
Ramon Stagnaro — Guitar, requinto
David Corpus — vocals
Ismael Gallegos — Vocals
Bolero Soul — Vocals
Arturo Gutierrez — Vocals
José Luis Gutiérrez — Vocals

Chart performance

Sales and certifications

References

2003 albums
Marco Antonio Solís albums
Fonovisa Records albums